The sea buckthorn moth (Gelechia hippophaella) is a moth of the family Gelechiidae. It is found from Fennoscandia to the Pyrenees, Italy and Romania and from Great Britain to Ukraine.

References

Moths described in 1802
Gelechia
Moths of Europe